Bathypathes is a genus of black coral in the family Schizopathidae.

Species 
Fourteen species are currently recognized in the genus.

References 

Cnidarians of the Pacific Ocean
Cnidarians of the Atlantic Ocean
Cnidarians of the Indian Ocean
Antipatharia